Sofija Tepes (born 18 March 1973) is a Chilean table tennis player. She competed at the 1992 Summer Olympics, the 1996 Summer Olympics, and the 2000 Summer Olympics.

References

1973 births
Living people
Chilean female table tennis players
Olympic table tennis players of Chile
Table tennis players at the 1992 Summer Olympics
Table tennis players at the 1996 Summer Olympics
Table tennis players at the 2000 Summer Olympics
Place of birth missing (living people)
Table tennis players at the 1991 Pan American Games
Table tennis players at the 1995 Pan American Games
Table tennis players at the 1999 Pan American Games
Medalists at the 1991 Pan American Games
Medalists at the 1995 Pan American Games
Medalists at the 1999 Pan American Games
Pan American Games medalists in table tennis
Pan American Games silver medalists for Chile
Pan American Games bronze medalists for Chile
20th-century Chilean women